Shaba (Persian: شناسه حساب بانکی ایران (شبا)) is a national standard defined in the framework of the global IBAN standard with the aim of integrating bank accounts in Iran. Shaba starts with "IR" followed by 24 other digits.

External links 

 Shaba validation using Python at GitHub

References 

ISO standards
Banking
Banking by country
Banking in Iran
Banking terms
Bank codes